Maharaja Sir Mohammad Amir Hasan Khan, Khan Bahadur,  KCIE (1849 - 27 June 1903) was the Raja of Mahmudabad from 1858 to 27 June 1903 and a noted zamindar of British India.

Raja of Mahmudabad
He was son of Raja Mohammad Nawab Ali Khan (d.1858), the Jagirdar of Taluq of Mahmudabad. He was born at Amrota in Sitapur district of Oudh, British India. After death of his father in 1858, he became the Raja of Mahmudabad. He took over management of Taluq in March 1867. The estate of Mahmudabad was among one the largest estate in United Province.

Honors and styles
Following titles have been used by him:
 Amir-ud-daula, 
 Sayyid-ul-Mulk, 
 Mumtaz Jung
 4 December 1877 - Sir, KCIE
 24 May 1883 - Raja
 5 March 1884 - Khan Bahadur

Death
He died in 1903 and was succeeded by his son, Mohammad Ali Mohammad Khan

References

External links

1849 births
1903 deaths
Indian royalty
Indian Shia Muslims
Knights Commander of the Order of the Indian Empire
Indian knights
19th-century Indian educational theorists
Members of the Imperial Legislative Council of India
Members of the Central Legislative Assembly of India
Urdu-language poets from India
People from Sitapur district
Founders of Indian schools and colleges
19th-century Indian poets
19th-century Indian philanthropists